The 1987 Macau Grand Prix Formula Three was the 34th Macau Grand Prix race to be held on the streets of Macau on 29 November 1987. It was the fourth edition for Formula Three cars. Heavy rain and strong winds from Typhoon Nina cancelled all of Saturday's activities and the starting order of the race was determined by the fastest lap times of the first practice session. Martin Donnelly of Intersport Engineering led the pack of cars going into Mandarin Oriental bend from pole position and led every lap to win. His teammate Jan Lammers finished second and Schubel Rennsport Int driver Bernd Schneider was third.

Entry list

Race Results

References

F2 Register

External links
 The official website of the Macau Grand Prix

Macau Grand Prix
Grand
Macau